André Guelfi (6 May 1919 – 28 June 2016) was a French racing driver. He was born in Mazagan, Morocco. He participated in one Formula One World Championship race, on 19 October 1958. He also participated in several non-championship Formula One races. At the time of his death he was the oldest living Formula One driver and had been since the death of Robert La Caze on 1 July 2015.

Complete Formula One World Championship results
(key)

References

1919 births
2016 deaths
French racing drivers
French Formula One drivers
People from El Jadida
24 Hours of Le Mans drivers
World Sportscar Championship drivers
French expatriates in Morocco